Almost Happy may refer to:

 Almost Happy (album), a 2000 album by K's Choice
 Almost Happy (TV series), an Argentinian comedy web television series